Eric H. Yoffie is a Reform rabbi, and President Emeritus of the Union for Reform Judaism (URJ), the congregational arm of the Reform movement in North America, which represents an estimated 1.5 million Reform Jews in more than 900 synagogues across the United States and Canada. He was the unchallenged head of American Judaism's largest denomination from 1996 to 2012. Following his retirement in 2012, he has been a lecturer and writer; his writings appear regularly in The Huffington Post, The Jerusalem Post, and Haaretz.

Family and career
Rabbi Yoffie was raised in Worcester, Massachusetts, where his family belonged to historic Temple Emanuel, and he was involved in the Reform Movement's Youth organization, the North American Federation of Temple Youth (NFTY). He first held the position of president in the Northeast Region of NFTY before moving on to be the organization's Vice President in 1965–1966.

After high school Yoffie spent his first year at Stanford University, and graduated from Brandeis University. He received his Rabbinical ordination from Hebrew Union College in New York in 1974. He served congregations in Lynbrook, NY, and Durham, NC, before joining the URJ as director of the Midwest Council in 1980. In 1983 he was named Executive Director of the Association of Reform Zionists of America (ARZA). In 1992 he became vice president of the URJ and director of the Commission on Social Action. In addition, he served as executive editor of the Reform Judaism magazine. On July 1, 1996, he succeeded Rabbi Alexander M. Schindler as president of the Union for Reform Judaism. In 1999 The Jewish Daily Forward named Yoffie the number one Jewish leader in America.

In 2009 Newsweek named him # 8 on its list of "50 Influential Rabbis."

He is married to Amy Jacobson Yoffie. The couple has two children, and reside in Westfield, New Jersey.

On June 10, 2010, Rabbi Yoffie announced his intention to step down from the post of president of the URJ at the age of 65, in June 2012. He was succeeded by Rabbi Rick Jacobs, who had served as the senior rabbi at Westchester Reform Temple in Scarsdale, NY.

Views on Jewish life
Rabbi Yoffie has been a proponent of increased traditionalism within Reform Judaism, encouraging a greater focus on Jewish text study and prayer. Dr. Jonathan Sarna, the dean of American Jewish historians, noted that Yoffie devoted time as President of the URJ to bringing "old ideas" to Reform Judaism, "urging its rank and file to focus on enriching their spiritual lives and expanding their knowledge of Judaism." During his tenure, he announced two major worship initiatives.  The first, in 1999, was designed to help congregations become "houses in which we pray with joy." The second, eight years later, fostered Shabbat observance among individual Reform Jews while encouraging congregations to rethink their Shabbat morning worship. Rabbi Yoffie was also a proponent of lifelong Jewish study and helped synagogues to develop programs that increased Jewish literacy among adults. In 2005, he introduced the Sacred Choices curriculum to teach sexual ethics to teens in Reform camps and congregations.

In his recent writings, Yoffie has argued against understandings of Judaism that are primarily secular or cultural, referring to such Jews as "self-delusional," and suggesting that such understandings mistake a part for the whole and that a religiously-grounded Judaism is essential to assure the Jewish future.

Views on interfaith relations

Rabbi Yoffie has been a pioneer in interfaith relations and launched Movement-wide dialogue programs with both Christians and Muslims. In 2005, he was the first Jew to address the Churchwide Assembly of the Evangelical Lutheran Church in America. Later that year, he harshly criticized some positions of the Religious Right, but in 2006 he accepted the invitation of the Rev. Jerry Falwell to address the students and faculty of Liberty University; as the first Rabbi to appear at a university-wide convocation, he talked frankly of areas of agreement and disagreement between Evangelical Christians and Jews. Yoffie first spoke on shared values of family and morality before defending church-state separation and gay marriage, which elicited boos from the students.

On August 21, 2007, Rabbi Yoffie was the first leader of a major Jewish organization to speak at the convention of the Islamic Society of North America. In his remarks he spoke of "a huge and profound ignorance of Islam" by Jews and Christians in North America. He stated that "the time has come to listen to our Muslim neighbors speak, from their heart and in their own words, about the spiritual power of Islam and their love for their religion."  He also asked Muslims for more understanding of Judaism: “The dialogue will not be one way, of course. You will teach us about Islam and we will teach you about Judaism.  We will help you to overcome stereotyping of Muslims, and you will help us to overcome stereotyping of Jews.” Rabbi Yoffie later was a supporter of the Park51 Community Center, and he has been a strong advocate for the rights of Muslim Americans.

In contrast to these above interfaith efforts, Yoffie strongly disagrees with atheism, claiming that it lacks "humility, imagination, and curiosity."

Views on social justice

As President of the URJ, Rabbi Yoffie spoke to a wide variety of social justice issues. He opposed the death penalty, supported LBGT rights, and was a prominent spokesperson for gun control. He was the only religious leader to appear at the Million Mom March in Washington, D.C., declaring that "the indiscriminate distribution of guns is an offense against God and humanity." Rabbi Yoffie went on to state that "our gun-flooded society has turned weapons into idols, and the worship of idols must be recognized for what it is—blasphemy. And the only appropriate religious response to blasphemy is sustained moral outrage."

Views on relations with Israel
Rabbi Yoffie has devoted much of his public life to working on behalf of the Jewish state and to promoting close ties between Israel and American Jews. During his years as URJ President, he met frequently with Israel's elected officials to present the concerns of the Reform movement and North American Jewry. He has been a prominent advocate of religious freedom and religious pluralism in Israel, arguing that the cause of Judaism can only be advanced by education and persuasion and not by coercion. In an incident that drew international headlines, Rabbi Yoffie in June 2006 declined to meet with Israeli President Moshe Katsav after the President refused to address Rabbi Yoffie with the title "Rabbi". The Chief Rabbinate of Israel does not recognize rabbinic ordinations from non-Orthodox institutions, In 2014, Rabbi Yoffie challenged the Presidential candidate, Reuven Rivlin, by asking if he would address Reform rabbis by the title "rabbi." While Rivlin did not respond directly to this issue while a candidate, a source close to him responded that he "has always received Rabbi Yoffie respectfully and will continue to have a wonderful relationship with Diaspora Jews."

Contemporary spirituality

In his recent writings, in the Huffington Post and elsewhere, Rabbi Yoffie has addressed broad questions of belief and spirituality in American life. In particular, he has applied a progressive religious point of view to issues of sin, atheism, and community, as well as contemporary matters such as immigration, health care, and economic justice. In "What it Means to be a Liberal Person of Faith" and in other widely read articles, he has suggested that progressive religion has a vital role to play during a time of "culture wars," fear of terrorism, and economic uncertainty.

References

External links
Rabbi Eric H. Yoffie, biography
Our New President Rabbi Eric H. Yoffie: Teacher of Living Torah, Interview by Aron Hirt-Manheimer, Union of American Hebrew Congregations, Fall 1996
Rabbi Eric H. Yoffie Contemplations, Interview by Aron Hirt-Manheimer, Union for Reform Judaism, Spring 2012

Living people
1940s births
American Reform rabbis
Rabbis from Massachusetts
Brandeis University alumni
Hebrew Union College – Jewish Institute of Religion alumni
20th-century American rabbis
21st-century American rabbis
People from Worcester, Massachusetts
People from Lynbrook, New York
People from Durham, North Carolina
People from Westfield, New Jersey